The Fink-Type Truss Bridge, also known as the Hamden Bridge, carried Hamden Road/River Road over the South Branch Raritan River, the border between Clinton Township and Franklin Township, at Hamden near the Allerton section of Hunterdon County, New Jersey. The bridge was built in 1857 by the Trenton Locomotive and Machine Manufacturing Company.

The bridge was added to the National Register of Historic Places on December 24, 1974, for its significance in engineering. At the time of its nomination, it was one of the earliest surviving iron truss bridges in the United States. The Fink truss bridge was patented by Albert Fink in 1854, and the Hunterdon county bridge, built 3 years later, was a nearly perfect example of the patented design. It collapsed as a result of an automobile collision in 1978. The remaining pieces were subsequently relocated to the Hunterdon County Government Center. It was documented by the Historic American Engineering Record in 1984, which included photos from 1971.

See also
National Register of Historic Places listings in Hunterdon County, New Jersey
List of bridges documented by the Historic American Engineering Record in New Jersey
List of bridges on the National Register of Historic Places in New Jersey
List of Historic Civil Engineering Landmarks
List of crossings of the Raritan River

References

External links

Bridges in Hunterdon County, New Jersey
Truss bridges in the United States
Bridges completed in 1857
Road bridges on the National Register of Historic Places in New Jersey
National Register of Historic Places in Hunterdon County, New Jersey
New Jersey Register of Historic Places
Historic American Engineering Record in New Jersey
1857 establishments in New Jersey
Clinton Township, New Jersey
Franklin Township, Hunterdon County, New Jersey
Bridges over the Raritan River
Historic Civil Engineering Landmarks